Fiesta Marina Cruises was an experimental short-lived subsidiary cruise line of Carnival Cruise Lines. It was marketed toward the Latin/Spanish-speaking population, residing in the United States and abroad. The cruise line sailed out of San Juan, Puerto Rico and Caracas, Venezuela. It operated only one ship, the Fiesta Marina, which was named in Miami, Florida on October 18, 1993

The cruise line was a marketing failure and was dissolved in September 1994. The Fiesta Marina was sold to Epirotiki Cruises to sail as the Olympic. In 2007, the Carnival Corporation started a partnership with the Orizonia Corporación to launch a new cruise line called Iberocruceros, also marketed toward the Latin/Spanish-speaking population. The cruise line operated out of South America and Europe, independently from Carnival, but was managed by Costa Cruises. Iberocruceros was closed in 2014 and its ships transferred to Costa or elsewhere.

Former fleet

References 

Carnival Corporation & plc
Defunct cruise lines
Transport companies established in 1993
Companies disestablished in 1994
1993 establishments in Florida
1994 disestablishments in Florida